Tree International Publishing was a major music publisher, based in Nashville.  As the last major music publisher that was owned and operated in Nashville, it was sold to the CBS Records Group in 1989. The catalog is now part of Sony Music Publishing.

History

Tree International Publishing was founded by Jack Stapp in the 1950s.  In 1953, Stapp hired Buddy Killen, then twenty years old, to audition songs and sing demos.  In 1956, Killen discovered "Heartbreak Hotel", which he persuaded Elvis Presley to record.

After Stapp died in 1980, Killen became the president and sole owner of the company.  In 1989, Killen sold the company to CBS Records, owned by Sony for a price estimated to be between $30 million and $40 million.  At the time, Tree International Publishing had a catalogue of approximately 35,000 songs and had been the leading publisher on the Billboard charts since 1973.

References

Music publishing companies of the United States
Sony Music Publishing